Andrew Aydin (born August 25, 1983) is an American comics writer, known as the Digital Director & Policy Advisor to Georgia congressman John Lewis, and co-author, with Lewis, of Lewis' #1 New York Times bestselling autobiographical graphic novel trilogy March—with Representative John Lewis, which debuted in 2013 by Top Shelf Productions.

Early life
Aydin was born in Atlanta, Georgia. He attended the Lovett School in Atlanta, Georgia, earned a Bachelor of Arts from Trinity College and a Master of Arts in public policy from Georgetown University.,

Career
After college, Aydin served as District Aide to Representative John B. Larson (D-CT) and as Special Assistant to Connecticut Lieutenant Governor Kevin Sullivan.

In 2007, Aydin began working for Georgia congressman John Lewis. In the summer of 2008, while on Rep. Lewis' reelection campaign, Aydin learned that Lewis had been inspired as a young man by a classic 1950s comic book, Martin Luther King and the Montgomery Story. They discussed the impact that comic books can have on young readers and soon Aydin had the idea that Lewis should write a comic book about his time in the civil rights movement. Aydin eventually convinced Lewis, who accepted on the condition that Aydin write the comics with him.

Aydin wrote his graduate thesis on the history and impact of Martin Luther King and the Montgomery Story. Until 2012, no history of Martin Luther King and the Montgomery Story had been written, and most versions of how the comic was created listed Al Capp as the actual creator. As part of his graduate degree at Georgetown University, Aydin wrote the first long-form history of The Montgomery Story as his graduate thesis. With the help of Carlow University Professor Dr. Sylvia Rhor and comic book icon Eddie Campbell, Aydin established most of what we know about the comic's creation and use. In August 2013, Aydin published a shortened version of his thesis as the feature article in Creative Loafing's award-winning "Future of Nonviolence" issue, which was guest-edited by Lewis and Aydin.

Aydin has appeared as a guest on The Rachel Maddow Show, Morning Joe, National Public Radio, CBS This Morning, CNN, and the BBC.

Aydin currently serves as Digital Director & Policy Advisor to Representative Lewis in his Washington, D.C. office.

March trilogy

In August 2013, Top Shelf Productions published the first book in the March trilogy, a black and white graphic novel about the Civil Rights Movement, told through the perspective of Lewis, written by Lewis and Aydin, and illustrated and lettered by Nate Powell. The book had its genesis in Lewis' 2008 reelection campaign, when Lewis told Aydin about The Montgomery Story and its influence on the civil rights movement. Aydin, who had been reading comics since his grandmother bought him a copy of Uncanny X-Men #317 off a Piggly Wiggly spinner rack when he was eight years old, found a digital copy of the book on the Internet and spent years tracking down an original print copy on eBay. The Montgomery Story directly influenced on the creation of March.

President Bill Clinton has said of Congressman Lewis that, through March, "he brings a whole new generation with him across the Edmund Pettus Bridge, from a past of clenched fists into a future of outstretched hands." Apple CEO Tim Cook has said that March is "a very unique way to present what is probably the most important story of my entire lifetime. My hope is that everyone reads this, and I would love to see the day that it is required reading in every school."

March: Book One holds an average 9.4 out of 10 rating at the review aggregator website Comic Book Roundup, based on five reviews. In addition to receiving positive reviews, it won numerous awards and accolades, was selected for college-level reading lists and by first-year reading programs in 2014 at Michigan State University, Georgia State University, and Marquette University. March: Book One received an "Author Honor" from the American Library Association's 2014 Coretta Scott King Book Awards. Book One also became the first graphic novel to win a Robert F. Kennedy Book Award, receiving a "Special Recognition" bust in 2014.

March: Book Two was released in 2015 and became both a New York Times bestseller for paperback graphic novels and Washington Post bestseller for paperback nonfiction books. At San Diego Comic Con in July 2016, March: Book Two won the Will Eisner Comic Industry Award for "Best Reality Based Work."

The release of March: Book Three in August 2016 brought all three volumes into the top 3 slots of the New York Times bestseller list for graphic novels for 6 consecutive weeks. In November 2016, March: Book Three was awarded the National Book Award in Young People's Literature, becoming the first graphic novel to receive a National Book Award. In January 2017 at the American Library Association's annual Midwinter Meeting the third volume was announced as the recipient of the 2017 Printz Award, the Coretta Scott King Award, the YALSA Award for Excellence in Nonfiction, and the Sibert Medal. It was the first time a single book won four A.L.A. awards. The trilogy received the Carter G. Woodson Book Award in 2017.

In May 2016, NYC Public Schools announced that the March trilogy was added to the systemwide 8th Grade "Passport to Social Studies" curriculum. In October 2016, Atlanta Public Schools announced the March trilogy's addition to English curriculum.

Awards and honors
Aydin and his co-authors on March were recipients of the 2014 Coretta Scott King Book Award Author Honor, the 2013 Gem Award (Independent Graphic Novel of the Year), and the 2014 YALSA Top Ten Great Graphic Novels for Teens.

In March 2014 Aydin and his co-authors received a Special Recognition award at the 2014 Robert F. Kennedy Book Awards.

That same year, March was nominated for two Eisner Awards: Best Publication for Teens & Best Reality-Based Work. March was also nominated for two Harvey Awards: Best Graphic Album – Original & Best Biographical, Historical, or Journalistic Presentation.

References

External links

1983 births
American graphic novelists
American male novelists
Carter G. Woodson Book Award winners
McCourt School of Public Policy alumni
Inkpot Award winners
Living people
Novelists from Georgia (U.S. state)
Trinity College (Connecticut) alumni
Writers from Atlanta
Robert F. Sibert Informational Book Medal winners